Antara Polanco, is an upscale open-air shopping center in Polanco, Mexico City, Mexico.

Background
The Antara Polanco shopping center opened its doors in 2006. Two years after the opening, phase 2 of the development project was launched with the construction of two office buildings behind the mall.

In 2015, Mexico's 500th Starbucks opened in Antara Polanco. In 2018, the mall's Cinemex was the first movie theater in Latin America to use Samsung's LED screen Onyx. In September 2019, Mexico City's second Apple Store opened in Antara Polanco. In September 2020, a customer caused a stir by bringing her pet tiger with her to the mall. In 2021, Dyson announced the opening of its first store in Latin America in Antara Polanco.

Description
The center was designed by the Mexican architect Javier Sordo Madaleno. The mall hosts several concerts, fashion shows, and expos throughout the year.  It is composed of 3 separate stories and is home to over 100 stores, 6 gourmet restaurants, and a Cinemex movie theater. It's built on what used to be a General Motors factory.

References

External links
 Official Site

Miguel Hidalgo, Mexico City
Buildings and structures in Mexico City
Retailing in Mexico City
Shopping malls in Greater Mexico City
Shopping malls established in 2006